NHK World Premium is a TV news and entertainment broadcasting service offered by NHK World-Japan, the international arm of Japan's public broadcaster NHK. The service is aimed towards overseas Japanese and the overseas market, similar to worldwide national channels such as CCTV-4, KBS World, TV5Monde, TVE Internacional, RTP Internacional, TV Chile, Rai Italia or RTR-Planeta, and broadcast through subscription TV providers around the world.

The purpose of NHK World Premium is to make original, general television content produced by NHK available to an international audience. It provides a mixture of news, sports and entertainment shows in Japanese language, all of which are simulcast or previously shown on NHK's domestic TV networks in Japan (NHK G, NHK E, NHK BS 1, NHK BS Premium, NHK BS4K, and NHK BS8K).

The service is marketed as a pay satellite or cable TV channel with that name Across Asia Pacific, Africa (Except North Africa Arabic Speaking Countries) & Latin America, except for in Europe, North Africa and North America. In Europe, the Middle East and North Africa, the service is broadcast under the brand name JSTV, and in the US and Canada, it is known as TV Japan. Unlike the regular NHK World Premium service, both JSTV and TV Japan offer some additional programming from other major Japanese TV broadcasters such as TV Tokyo or Fuji TV among others, in addition to Mostly NHK's Original shows. Contents generally do not carry English subtitles or dubbing, while a few of them, especially news, have bilingual audio (a feature kept from their original, domestic broadcast in Japan, where it is offered as well for Newscast Only).

Programmes 
 Food  (carry Fod listed as BBC Japan) 
 AKB48 Show!
 Everyday Tips
 Fudoki
 Fun with English
 Go Focus
 Good Morning, Japan
 International News Report 
 Mini Program
 Morning Market
 News (carry news from NHK General TV)
 News & Weather (from NHK General TV)
 News Watch 9 
 NHK News (carry news from NHK BS 1 which usually airs at 50 minutes past the hour)
 NHK News 7
 NHK Premap (program highlights)
 Nippon Professional Baseball
 Kōhaku Uta Gassen
 Science for Everyone
 Shounen Club
 Sports Plus
 Utacon
 With Mother
 World Weather

Internet service 
NHK World Premium programs and contents are available online but for the linear channel, which mostly aired NHK titles including live events, were available on selected countries, including Asian countries outside Japan. The European service JSTV also offers an Internet broadcast of NHK World Premium through their JSTV 2 channel, which is a simulcast of NHK World Premium.

See also 
 NHK World
 NHK World TV

References 

 https://nhkworldpremium.com/faq/

External links 

24-hour television news channels in Japan
English-language television stations
Cable television in Hong Kong
Television channels and stations established in 1998